Samantha Jane Bond (born 27 November 1961) is an English actress, who is best known for playing Miss Moneypenny in four James Bond films during the Pierce Brosnan years, and for her role on Downton Abbey as the wealthy widow Lady Rosamund Painswick, sister of Robert Crawley, the Earl of Grantham. She is also known for originating the role of "Miz Liz" Probert in the Rumpole of the Bailey series. Bond is a member of the Royal Shakespeare Company. In her television career, she is known for her role as "Auntie Angela" in the sitcom Outnumbered and the villain Mrs Wormwood in the CBBC Doctor Who spin-off, The Sarah Jane Adventures.

Early life
Samantha Bond is the daughter of actor Philip Bond and TV producer Pat Sandys, and is the sister of the actress Abigail Bond and the journalist Matthew Bond. Bond's paternal grandparents were Welsh. She was brought up in London and Richmond-upon-Thames, in homes in Barnes and St Margarets. She attended the Godolphin and Latymer School, and studied acting at the Bristol Old Vic Theatre School.

Career

Early career

Bond's first acting role came as a student at age 21, in the original stage production of Daisy Pulls It Off, Denise Deegan's play about a girls school, which opened at Southampton's Nuffield Theatre in 1983. Her earliest television roles took place the same year: she played Maria Rushworth (née Bertram) in the BBC mini-series adaptation of Jane Austen's Mansfield Park, and Rumpole's pupil in chambers "Miz Liz" Probert in the fourth series of Rumpole of the Bailey.  In 1985, she appeared as Julia Simmons in the BBC's televised adaptation of Agatha Christie's crime novel A Murder is Announced, part of the Miss Marple series.

Theatre

Bond's work with the Royal Shakespeare Company (the RSC) began in 1987, when she performed in three of the company's stage productions: Les Liaisons Dangereuses, Hero and Leander, and Lorca's Women. In 1992, the RSC cast her as Rosalind in Shakespeare's As You Like It, which she performed in their Stratford-upon-Avon and London theatres, and as Hermione in The Winter's Tale, also at the company's two theatres.  She then toured with the RSC as Hermione in 1993.

Bond starred as the titular Amy in the Royal National Theatre's West End production of David Hare's play Amy's View, opposite Judi Dench, in 1997 and into early 1998. Later in 1998, she co-starred in playwright Shelagh Stephenson's The Memory of Water, also in the West End.

In 1999, Bond and Dench reprised their roles in Amy's View on Broadway for a limited run at the Ethel Barrymore Theatre.  Their performances garnered Bond a Tony nomination for Best Featured Actress in a Play, and Dench the Tony Award for Best Leading Actress in a Play.  Hare received a special citation from the New York Drama Critics' Circle.

Bond revisited The Memory of Water, making her directorial debut on a short touring production of the play in 2000, the same year it won an Olivier award for Best New Comedy. She also performed in numerous stage productions during the 2000s, among them: 
Shakespeare's A Midsummer Night's Dream in 2001, as Hippolyta and Titania, again for the RSC; Donald Margulies's Pulitzer prize-winning Dinner with Friends, as Karen, opposite her Downton Abbey co-star Elizabeth McGovern and directed by McGovern's husband Simon Curtis, in 2001; The Vagina Monologues in 2002; and in Shakespeare's Macbeth, as Lady Macbeth opposite Sean Bean in the title role, on tour in 2002 and 2003.

Other stage performances include Oscar Wilde's A Woman of No Importance in 2003; The Rubenstein Kiss in 2005; Michael Frayn's Donkey's Years at London's Comedy Theatre in 2006; and David Leveaux's West End revival of Tom Stoppard's Arcadia at the Duke of York's Theatre, in 2009 as Hannah, alongside another Downton Abbey co-star, Dan Stevens.

The next decade brought Bond onstage in Oscar Wilde's An Ideal Husband, as Mrs. Cheveley opposite her real-life actor husband Alexander Hanson as Mr. Cheveley, in 2010–2011, and as Nell in Passion Play by Peter Nichols in 2013.  In 2014, Bond acted and sang in the West End musical production of Dirty Rotten Scoundrels, playing the role of Muriel Eubanks.  Bond stated in an interview that she hadn't sung on stage in over 30 years and had many moments during rehearsals where she turned her back toward anyone listening to her sing and frequently shook "with terror" at the prospect.  In a Radio Times review of the play, the critic described Bond as "stage royalty" and "hilarious."  In October and November 2017, Bond appeared in the English language premiere of Florian Zeller's modern French farce, The Lie, once again alongside her husband, Alexander Hanson, at an Off-West End theatre called the Menier Chocolate Factory.

Television and film

In 1989, Bond starred as Mary MacKenzie, a young Scottish woman, in the television adaptation of Oswald Wynd's novel The Ginger Tree, and was featured in Erik the Viking, an independent fantasy film with Tim Robbins in the title role.

She appeared in a 1990 adaptation of Agatha Christie's short story The Adventure of the Cheap Flat for the series Agatha Cristie's Poirot on ITV, starring David Suchet as Hercule Poirot.  Bond was also seen on ITV in an episode of the "Inspector Morse" detective drama series based on novels by Colin Dexter, in 1992, and in a 1995 episode of Ghosts, an anthology series of ghost stories on the BBC.  In 1996, she portrayed Mrs. Weston in the television movie Jane Austen's Emma, starring Kate Beckinsale as Emma, a Meridian-ITV/A&E production that has been described as grittier and "more authentic" to Austen's story than the theatrical film starring Gwyneth Paltrow that was released the same year. The television movie was broadcast in the US in 1997 on PBS.

From 1995 to 2002, Bond played Miss Moneypenny, M's secretary at MI6, in the four James Bond films with Pierce Brosnan as Agent 007: GoldenEye, Tomorrow Never Dies, The World Is Not Enough, and Die Another Day. The role of Miss Moneypenny is the smallest role she ever played, yet the character remains a favorite among James Bond fans. In a BBC interview, Bond remarked that she retired from the role when Pierce Brosnan stepped down as the lead.  However, she later appeared as Miss Moneypenny in an advertisement for London's 2012 Olympic bid, alongside previous Bond actor Roger Moore.

Bond co-starred in 2004 with Peter Davison, as a married couple who uproot themselves to a remote island to save their marriage, in the ITV drama-comedy Distant Shores. In 2007, she played the villain Mrs. Wormwood in the pilot episode of the BBC children's drama series The Sarah Jane Adventures, a spin-off of Doctor Who. She later came back to play the same character in the two-part finale of the show's second series, Enemy of the Bane.

Bond guest-starred in three episodes of the long-running and popular murder mystery series Midsomer Murders: Destroying Angel in 2001, Shot at Dawn in 2008, both starring fellow RSC member John Nettles in the lead role of DCI Tom Barnaby, as well as the first episode in 2011's series 14, Death in the Slow Lane. The 2011 episode is notable for Neil Dudgeon's debut as DCI John Barnaby, who takes over as the new detective in Midsomer after his cousin Tom Barnaby retired.

From 2007 to 2014, Bond had a recurring role as Auntie Angela in the BBC's semi-improvised comedy series Outnumbered, alongside Hugh Dennis, Claire Skinner and David Ryall. She appeared in all five series.

From 2010 through 2015 (in the UK), Bond appeared as Lady Rosamund Painswick in the ensemble cast of ITV's drama series Downton Abbey, written and produced by Julian Fellowes. Each series was shown in the US on PBS's Masterpiece program one year following its broadcast in the UK; according to PBS, Downton Abbey became the most popular drama ever shown on the station, and the most popular series in the history of Masterpiece. Lady Rosamund is the widowed, wealthy sister of Robert Crawley, the Earl of Grantham. Bond's first appearance was in the last episode of the first series; she appeared in 18 episodes in total.

The ITV show Home Fires featured Bond as Frances Barden, a woman working to strengthen connections among the women in her small English village by keeping the local Women's Institute operating during the early days of World War II. The show premiered in the UK in 2015 and was cancelled in 2016; fans petitioned ITV to reinstate it, to no avail. It played in the US on PBS's Masterpiece in 2016 and 2017, where viewers were similarly disappointed to learn of the show's demise. The series creator, Simon Block, has stated he intends to continue the story in written form, as novels. In 2020 Miss Bond played Joanne Henderson in Death in Paradise (S9:E5).

Audiobooks
Bond has narrated a number of audiobooks including Mary Norton's The Borrowers, Joanna Trollope's An Unsuitable Match, Anthony Horowitz's Magpie Murders and Helen Fielding's Bridget Jones's Baby: The Diaries' 'Goldeneye. She has most recently released S J Bennett's novel, The Windsor Knot. She received an Earphones Award for Magpie Murders.

Personal life
Bond lives in St Margarets, London, and has been married since 1989 to Alexander Hanson, with whom she has two children, Molly and Tom. She received an honorary doctorate from the University of Northampton in 2014.

Filmography

Film

Television

Narrator

Video games

Stage
Daisy Pulls It Off (Denise Deegan) at the Nuffield Theatre, 1983
Les Liaisons Dangereuses (Christopher Hampton) (Royal Shakespeare Company) at the Ambassadors Theatre, 1987
Hero and Leander (Royal Shakespeare Company) at the Barbican Theatre, 1987
Lorca's Women (Royal Shakespeare Company) at the Barbican Theatre, 1987
Man of the Moment (Alan Ayckbourn) at the Globe Theatre, 1990
Rosalind in As You Like It (Royal Shakespeare Company) at the Royal Shakespeare Theatre, 1992
Hermione in The Winter's Tale (Royal Shakespeare Company) at the Royal Shakespeare Theatre, 1992
Rosalind in As You Like It (Royal Shakespeare Company) at the Barbican Theatre, 1993
Hermione in The Winter's Tale (Royal Shakespeare Company) at the Barbican Theatre, 1993
Infanta in Le Cid (Pierre Corneille) at the Cottesloe Theatre, 1994. Nominated for an Olivier Award for Best Actress in a Supporting Role.
Amy in Amy's View (David Hare), 1997 and 1998
The Memory of Water (Shelagh Stephenson), 1998
Amy in Amy's View (David Hare) at the Ethel Barrymore Theatre, 1999. Nominated for a Tony Award for Best Featured Actress in a Play. Nominated for Outer Critics Circle Award for Outstanding Featured Actress in a Play.
Hippolyta and Titania in A Midsummer Night's Dream (Royal Shakespeare Company) at the Barbican Hall, 2001
Dinner with Friends (Donald Margulies) at the Hampstead Theatre, 2001
The Vagina Monologues, 2002
Lady Macbeth in Macbeth, 2002 and 2003
Mrs Arbuthnot in A Woman of No Importance (Oscar Wilde) at the Haymarket Theatre, 2003
The Rubenstein Kiss (James Phillips) at the Hampstead Theatre, 2005
Donkey's Years (Michael Frayn) at London's Comedy Theatre, 2006. Nominated for an Olivier Award for Best Actress in a Supporting Role.
Hannah in David Leveaux's West End revival of Tom Stoppard's Arcadia at the Duke of York's Theatre, 2009
Mrs. Cheveley in An Ideal Husband (Oscar Wilde), 2010-2011
Mrs Prentice in What The Butler Saw (Joe Orton) at the Vaudeville Theatre, 2012
Nell in Passion Play (Peter Nichols), 2013
Muriel Eubanks in Dirty Rotten Scoundrels, 2014. Nominated for an Olivier Award for Best Actress in a Supporting Role in a Musical category. Nominated for Best Actress in a Supporting Role in a Musical category at the WhatsOnStage Awards.
Appeared in English language premiere of Florian Zeller's modern French farce, The Lie, 2017

Awards and nominations

Television

Theatre

References

External links
 

1961 births
Living people
English film actresses
English television actresses
English voice actresses
People educated at Godolphin and Latymer School
English people of Welsh descent
Royal Shakespeare Company members
Alumni of Bristol Old Vic Theatre School
20th-century English actresses
21st-century English actresses
English Shakespearean actresses
Actresses from London
English stage actresses
People from Kensington